The following is a list of the oldest buildings on Kansas college and university campuses, all of which were built prior to 1910.  Twelve individual buildings and one complex of buildings are listed on the United States Department of the Interior's National Register of Historic Places.

Kansas State University has the most buildings on this list, with eleven.  The list does not include buildings that were built elsewhere and subsequently relocated onto campuses, such as the Osborne Chapel at Baker University, which was built in England in 1864 and moved to the Baker campus in 1996.

See also
List of the oldest buildings in Kansas

References

Architecture in Kansas

Landmarks in Kansas
O
K
Kansas State University academic buildings
O